Congregation of the Disciples of the Lord (also known as, Congregatio Discipulorum Domini also its translation in Latin) is a Catholic religious institute, founded by future Cardinal Celso Costantini, an Italian, on 4 January 1927 at Xuanhua (Süanhwafu) of Hebei Province in China. It was the only Catholic institute to be established in Asia.

External links
 歡迎參觀 - Congregatio Discipulorum Domini official website in Chinese and English

Catholic orders and societies
Christian organizations established in 1931
Catholicism in China